"This Is Your Song" is a song by Irish singer-songwriter Ronan Keating, written by himself along with Steve Mac. It was released digitally on 17 March 2009 as the second single from Keating's fifth studio album Songs for My Mother.

Originally the song was published in 1999 as the B-side of his debut single "When You Say Nothing at All" and a few years later it was rearranged and included in the album Turn It On (2003). Moreover, in 2004 it was included in the compilation 10 Years of Hits and published this once more as a B-side of the single I Hope You Dance.

Background
Originally Keating had no intention of recording the song but, after his bandmates persuaded him, a recording was made for his debut single, released in 1999.

Keating talked about the difficulties he faced when writing and recording this song: "I tried to capture the woman that she [mother] was in the words to this song, but it wasn't easy. She loved her family more than anything in the world and all she wanted was to see them all grow up healthy, strong and happy. I guess as parents it's all we really want."

Music video
The music video was filmed in Sydney, Australia around April 2009. Keating is seen visiting a house that appears to be his childhood home, and his flashbacks of his childhood with his mother are projected around him.

Track listing
Digital download
"This Is Your Song" (radio mix) – 3:45

German digital single
"This Is Your Song" – 3:57
"This Is Your Song" (2003 version) – 3:59

References

1999 songs
2009 singles
1990s ballads
2000s ballads
Ronan Keating songs
Songs written by Ronan Keating
Songs written by Steve Mac
Song recordings produced by Stephen Lipson
Polydor Records singles